Will to Power is a 2008 American thriller film written and directed by David Rountree and starring David Rountree, Chris Moir, Rosie Garcia, Jonathan Breck, Kiko Ellsworth, David Banks, Kathy Lamkin, Sean Cronin and Kenn Woodard as Mr. Conner.

Plot
Two best friends are enrolled in a psychology class. The new teacher Mr. Conner gives out a bizarre assignment which has the students to pick somebody itself and write a paper on how they would commit their perfect murder. Jason and Erik decide that they are tired of their lives and swear to carry out everything that they have begun. Problems arise when Erik gets romantically involved with Kathryn, who has been chosen as the "victim".

External links

2008 films
American thriller drama films
2008 thriller drama films
2008 drama films
2000s English-language films
2000s American films